Gladisch is a German language surname. Notable people with the name include:
 Alfred Moschkau (1848–1912), German philatelist and local historian
 Kathleen Slattery-Moschkau, American filmmaker, yoga instructor, and former pharmaceutical sales representative

References 

German-language surnames
Surnames of German origin
Germanized Slavic family names